Carlos Felipe (born January 12, 1995) is a Brazilian mixed martial artist who  competed in the Heavyweight division. A professional since 2014, he most notably fought for the Ultimate Fighting Championship (UFC).

Background

Born in Feira de Santana, Bahia in 1995, Carlos Felipe was bullied throughout his childhood for being overweight. At age 14, Felipe weighed in at 346 pounds. Felipe was morbidly obese and his family tried everything, but nothing seemed to help him lose weight. After trying many different ways to lose weight, various diets and supplements, Felipe says boxing finally helped him drop from 346 pounds to 275 in just 12 months. He gained so much more confidence that he even began running to the local gym every day, training, then running back home once finished.

Mixed martial arts career

Early career

Starting his professional career in 2014, Felipe fought for various Brazilian regional promotions, amassing an undefeated 8–0 record, winning 6 out of 8 by first round KO.

Ultimate Fighting Championship
After signing with the UFC, on September 19, Felipe was flagged for a potential USADA violation stemming from an out-of-competition sample collected July 29. Therefore, he was pulled from his UFC debut against Christian Colombo at UFC Fight Night: Brunson vs. Machida. On October 20, it was announced that Felipe accepted a two-year suspension retroactive to the date of his provisional suspension. He tested positive for metabolites of stanozolol, 16β‐hydroxy‐stanozolol and 3’‐hydroxy‐stanozolol. He was eligible to return September 18th, 2019.

After being released after his positive test, Felipe was resigned to the UFC on July 20, 2019.

Felipe was expected to make his UFC debut against Sergey Spivak on May 9, 2020, at then UFC 250. However, on April 9, Dana White, the president of UFC announced that this event was postponed to a future date Eventually the bout was scheduled on July 19, 2020, at UFC Fight Night 172. He lost the fight via majority decision.

Felipe faced Yorgan de Castro, as a replacement for Ben Sosoli, on October 4, 2020, at UFC on ESPN: Holm vs. Aldana. He won the fight via unanimous decision.

Felipe faced Justin Tafa on January 16, 2021, at UFC Fight Night: Holloway vs. Kattar. He won the bout via split decision. 16 out of 20 media scores gave it to Tafa.

As the first bout of his new, four-fight contract Felipe faced Jake Collier on June 12, 2021, at UFC 263. He won the fight by split decision.

Felipe faced former UFC Heavyweight Champion Andrei Arlovski on October 16, 2021, at UFC Fight Night 195. He lost the fight via unanimous decision.

On January 18, 2022, it was announced that Felipe was given a 18-month suspension and 15 percent fine of his fight purse after tested positive for the anabolic agent Boldenone and its metabolites on Oct. 16 in relation to his decision loss to Andrei Arlovski at UFC Vegas 40. He was fined $4,200 of his purse and $489 in prosecution fees. His suspension is retroactive to the night of his failed test, meaning Felipe will be cleared to resume competing on April 16, 2023.

Following the second doping violation, Felipe was released by the UFC.

Mixed martial arts record

|-
|Loss
|align=center|11–2
|Andrei Arlovski
|Decision (unanimous)
|UFC Fight Night: Ladd vs. Dumont 
|
|align=center|3
|align=center|5:00
|Las Vegas, Nevada, United States
|
|-
|Win
|align=center|11–1
|Jake Collier
|Decision (split)
|UFC 263 
|
|align=center|3
|align=center|5:00
|Glendale, Arizona, United States
|
|-
|Win
|align=center| 10–1
|Justin Tafa
|Decision (split)
|UFC on ABC: Holloway vs. Kattar
|
|align=center| 3
|align=center| 5:00
|Abu Dhabi, United Arab Emirates
| 
|-
|Win
|align=center| 9–1
|Yorgan de Castro
|Decision (unanimous)
|UFC on ESPN: Holm vs. Aldana
|
|align=center| 3
|align=center| 5:00
|Abu Dhabi, United Arab Emirates
| 
|-
|Loss
|align=center| 8–1
|Sergey Spivak
|Decision (majority)
|UFC Fight Night: Figueiredo vs. Benavidez 2 
|
|align=center|3
|align=center|5:00
|Abu Dhabi, United Arab Emirates
| 
|-
|Win
|align=center| 8–0
|Francisco Sandro da Silva Bezerra
|TKO (punches and elbows)
|Qualify Combat 2
|
|align=center| 1
|align=center| 4:07
|Salvador, Brazil
| 
|-
|Win
|align=center| 7–0
|Paulo Cesar Almeida
|TKO (punches)
|Fight On 4
| 
|align=center| 1
|align=center| 0:41
|Salvador, Brazil
| 
|-
|Win
|align=center| 6–0
|Wagner Maia
|Decision (unanimous)
|Shooto Brazil 68
|
|align=center| 3
|align=center| 5:00
|Brasília, Brazil
| 
|-
|Win
|align=center| 5–0
|Pedro Mendes
|TKO  (punches)
|The King of Arena Fight 3
|
|align=center| 1
|align=center| 1:48
|Alagoinhas, Brazil
|
|-
|Win
|align=center| 4–0
|Andre Miranda
|Decision  (unanimous)
|Fight On 3
|
|align=center| 3
|align=center| 5:00
|Salvador, Brazil
| 
|-
|Win
|align=center| 3–0
|Alex Ardson
|TKO (rib injury)
|MNA MMA Circuit 2
|
|align=center| 1
|align=center| 5:00
|Seabra, Brazil
| 
|-
|Win
|align=center| 2–0
|Fernando Batista
|TKO
|Full House: Battle Home 9
|
|align=center| 1
|align=center| 3:37
|Belo Horizonte, Brazil
| 
|-
|Win
|align=center| 1–0
|Ronilson Santos
|TKO (punches)
|Velame Fight Combat 3
|
|align=center| 1
|align=center| 2:20
|Feira de Santana, Brazil
| 
|-

See also 
 List of male mixed martial artists

References

External links 
  
  

1995 births
Living people
People from Feira de Santana
Brazilian male mixed martial artists
Heavyweight mixed martial artists
Mixed martial artists utilizing boxing
Ultimate Fighting Championship male fighters
Doping cases in mixed martial arts
Brazilian sportspeople in doping cases
Sportspeople from Bahia